‘Apifo’ou College (Tongan: Kolisi ‘Apifo’ou) is a co-educational secondary school located at Ma’ufanga on the island of Tongatapu in the Kingdom of Tonga. It is the largest and oldest Catholic secondary school in Tonga. It is owned by the Roman Catholic Diocese of Tonga and Niue, and is run by priests of the Society of Mary.

History  
‘Apifo’ou College traces its foundation to 1865 when French Marist priest, Fr Jean-Amand Lamaze, founded an all-boys secondary school named St Stanislaus College at ‘Ahopanilolo, Ma’ufanga with a syllabus that included reading, writing, geography, history, arithmetic, astronomy, geometry and religious education. With a view to expanding the school, in 1881 St Stanislaus College was moved to a ‘new property’ (Tongan: ‘Api Fo’ou) nearby to continue as a day school with newly arrived Fr Armand Olier as the first Principal at the new site. On August 15, 1886 the college officially became a boarding school but with its name changed to Peter Chanel College. In an effort to raise the academic standard, Bishop John Rodgers established St John's High School at Makamaka in 1962 so as to allow boys to follow the NZ syllabus before relocating it to ‘Api Fo’ou in 1964. The Missionary Sisters of the Society of Mary then set up St Ann's High School at Makamaka in 1964 as an all-girls school under the NZ syllabus before it, too, along with newly established St Cecilia at 'Ahopanilolo (since January 1965) were both relocated to ‘Api Fo’ou on September 8, 1965 to form St Mary's High School. In marking the centenary of 'Api Fo'ou as a boarding school in 1986, Bishop Patelisio Punou-Ki-Hihifo Finau decided to amalgamate the all-boys St John's High School and all-girls St Mary's High School in 1987 into a single co-educational school named 'Apifo'ou College. This was followed in 2011 with the celebration of the school's 125-year anniversary, hence counting once again from the first boarding school at ‘Api Fo’ou in 1886. In 2020, the school celebrated its 155th anniversary, thereby recognizing the college established in 1865 by Fr Lamaze as its foundation.

Cyclone Gita 
Severe tropical Cyclone Gita struck Tonga in February 2018. Of the secondary schools on the island of Tongatapu that were damaged by the cyclone, none sustained heavier damage than ‘Apifo’ou College. Rebuilding of the damaged classrooms was completed at the end of 2020 thanks to funding from the World Bank and the Australian government.

Clergy 
‘Apifo’ou College has a long history of being a source of clergy for the local Catholic Diocese of Tonga and Niue and elsewhere. The current bishop, Soane Patita Paini Cardinal Mafi, is a past student of the school, as were two of his predecessors, Patelisio Punou-Ki-Hihifo Finau and Soane Lilo Foliaki.

Notable alumni 

 Cardinal Soane Patita Paini Mafi – Member of the College of Cardinals & head of the Catholic Church in Tonga and Niue
 Bishop Patelisio Punou-Ki-Hihifo Finau – Former head of the Catholic Church in Tonga and Niue
 Bishop Soane Lilo Foliaki – Former head of the Catholic Church in Tonga and Niue
Sir Sofele Kakala – Knight of the Order of St Gregory the Great
 Lord Sevele of Vailahi – Former Prime Minister of Tonga
Lita Foliaki Edwards – Honorary Member of the New Zealand Order of Merit
'Alisi Afeaki Taumoepeau – First Tongan woman to become a Government Minister
Vaea Naufahu 'Anitoni – US Rugby Hall of Fame inductee
 Manakaetau 'Otai – Former Captain & Coach of ‘Ikale Tahi
Shannon Frizell – New Zealand All Blacks blindside flanker

Notes

External links 
 Official website

Catholic schools in Oceania
Schools in Tonga
Catholic Church in Tonga
1865 establishments in Oceania
Tongatapu